The 1964 Dixmoor race riot, also known as the Gin Bottle Riot, occurred between August 15 and 17 in Dixmoor, Illinois. After a woman accused of shoplifting a bottle of gin was wrestled to the ground by the owner of the liquor store and arrested, black residents took to the streets in anger. They picketed the liquor store, but then attacked it, looting it and burning various nearby buildings.

Cause of the riot 
On August 15, 1964, Blondella Woods, a black woman and Chicago resident, was accused of stealing a bottle of gin from Foremost Liquors at 2240 West 147th Street in Dixmoor. When she tried to leave the store, owner Michael "Big Mike" LaPota and his employees wrestled Woods to the floor, reportedly to prevent her from fleeing or smashing liquor bottles. African-American witnesses recounted that LaPota and his employees beat Woods before she was arrested; she was taken to a hospital by police.

The next day at 11 a.m. on August 16, demonstrators picketed Foremost Liquors, protesting LaPota and his assault of Woods. They carried signs that read, "Big Mike Must Go," "Mike Beats Negro Women," and "Dixmoor Police are Afraid of Big Mike." This protest escalated into violence and a riot.

The riot 
Rioters attacked LaPota's liquor store first. After police arrived with firefighters with high-pressure hoses to protect the stores, the rioters began to attack passing motorists. They threw rocks, bottles, stones, and bricks, breaking car windows and windshields, and hurting drivers and passengers. State police fired small arms overhead while advancing toward the rioters. A total of 225 police officers from local, county, and state departments were called to the scene. Sheriff Richard B. Ogilvie, future Governor of Illinois, instructed police to broadcast over loudspeakers: "If you shoot, we’re going to fire back." According to Ogilvie, the riot began around 8 p.m. on August 16 and was over by 2 a.m. August 17 An estimated 1000 people were involved in the protest and riot. 37 people were injured, and 25 people were arrested and booked at the Harvey, Illinois police station.

See also
List of incidents of civil unrest in the United States

References

External links 
 "Dixmoor's Gin Bottle Riot", Chicago Tribune, 20 November 2014

1964 in Illinois
August 1964 events in the United States
Riots and civil disorder in Illinois
African-American history of Illinois
African-American riots in the United States
Cook County, Illinois
1964 riots
Ghetto riots (1964–1969)